A Taste of Honey was an American recording act, formed in 1972 by associates Janice-Marie Johnson and Perry Kibble. In 1978, they had one of the best known chart-toppers of the disco era, "Boogie Oogie Oogie". After their popularity waned during the 1980s, Johnson went on to record as a solo artist and released the album One Taste of Honey. In 2004, Janice–Marie Johnson and Hazel Payne reunited to perform on the PBS specials Get Down Tonight: The Disco Explosion and My Music: Funky Soul Superstars.

Biography
The band was formed in 1972, A Taste of Honey hailed from Los Angeles, California, United States. The members of the band consisted of Janice-Marie Johnson (vocals, co-writer, bass), Carlita Dorhan (vocals, guitar), Perry Kibble (keyboards, co-producer, co-writer) and Donald Ray Johnson (drums). Longtime friends Kibble and Janice-Marie Johnson were the original members of the band. Each had left a band to join forces, and after employing several drummers, they settled on Donald Johnson (no relation to Janice-Marie). Gregory Walker also replaced the lead singer (unnamed), who had left the band just prior to the successful release of "Boogie Oogie Oogie". Carlita Dorhan left the band in early 1976, and Hazel Payne was added.

A Taste of Honey began to improve its sound over a period of six years prior to being discovered by Capitol Records. Hitting major cities outside of Los Angeles, they also began doing USO tours, with spots in Spain, Morocco, Taiwan, Thailand, Philippines, South Korea and Japan. Upon returning to Los Angeles, while playing in a nightclub, they were spotted by record producers, Fonce and Larry Mizell, who convinced Capitol Records' then vice-executive-producer, Larkin Arnold, to give them an audition. They signed a five-album contract, and billed themselves after Herb Alpert's song, "A Taste of Honey". The first single, "Boogie Oogie Oogie", from their debut album A Taste of Honey, spent three weeks at number one on the Billboard Hot 100 in 1978, and sold two million copies. A Taste of Honey was awarded two platinum records for the single and album, and won the Grammy Award for Best New Artist at the 20th Grammys on February 15, 1979. Janice–Marie Johnson calls the single her "lifeline" and credits Capitol Records executive, Larkin Arnold, with ensuring they owned their own publishing. Their subsequent disco releases, such as "Do It Good" (number 79 in 1979) from Another Taste, and "Rescue Me" (1980) failed to attract attention, and by 1980 the group had become a duo consisting of Johnson and Payne.

When recording their cover version of the Kyu Sakamoto song "Sukiyaki", from their third album, Twice as Sweet (1980), they resisted suggestions to turn it into a dance tune. As a ballad it brought them their second and final major hit of their careers in 1981, when it reached number one on the Billboard R&B and Adult Contemporary charts and number 3 on the Hot 100.

A Taste of Honey released their fourth and final album, Ladies of the Eighties in 1982. It featured their final Billboard Hot 100 single, "I'll Try Something New" (number 41). This cover of the Smokey Robinson and the Miracles hit from 1962 also went to number 9 on the R&B charts and number 29 on the Adult Contemporary.

While preparing to record their fifth album in 1983, Payne left the group and Janice-Marie Johnson went on to record as a solo artist to fulfill contractual obligations, releasing One Taste of Honey, which produced the single "Love Me Tonight", a minor hit on the R&B chart. Payne went on to become an international stage actress.

Upon moving to Calgary, Alberta, Canada, in the early 1990s to play in local night clubs and to write music for a television production, Kibble married a local music teacher, Anne-Marie LaMonde, in 1993, and become stepfather to her three children, Natalie, Marci and Gregory Pilkington. Kibble died in February 1999 of heart failure, at the age of 49. Donald Ray Johnson continues to live and play blues in Calgary, where he also married a local. Johnson released several blues albums under his own name. The following year, Janice-Marie Johnson released her second solo album, Hiatus of the Heart. In 2004, Payne and Janice-Marie Johnson reunited for the first time in over twenty years to perform on the PBS specials Get Down Tonight: The Disco Explosion and My Music: Funky Soul Superstars.

Janice-Marie Johnson was inducted in the Native American Music Association Hall of Fame in 2008.

Guitarist Suzanne "Minnie" Thomas died on June 15, 2015, at the age of 60.

Discography

Studio albums

Live albums
Divas of Disco: Live (with CeCe Peniston, Thelma Houston, Linda Clifford, & France Joli) (2010, Pegasus)

Compilation albums
Golden Honey (1984, Capitol)
Anthology (1995, One Way)
Beauty and the Boogie (1997, EMI)
Classic Masters (2002, Capitol)

Singles

See also
 List of Billboard number-one singles
 List of artists who reached number one in the United States
 List of Billboard number-one dance club songs
 List of artists who reached number one on the U.S. Dance Club Songs chart

References

External links
 
 

American dance music groups
American funk musical groups
African-American girl groups
American disco groups
Grammy Award winners
Musical groups established in 1972
American soul musical groups
American disco girl groups
Capitol Records artists